Blood and Bone is a 2009 American direct-to-DVD martial arts film directed by Ben Ramsey and written by Michael Andrews. The film stars Michael Jai White, Eamonn Walker and Julian Sands, and features martial artist Matt Mullins, former professional wrestler Ernest "The Cat" Miller, MMA fighters Bob Sapp, Kimbo Slice, Maurice Smith, and Gina Carano.

Plot
Fresh out of prison, highly skilled martial artist and ex-marine Isaiah Bone (Michael Jai White) moves to Los Angeles, where underground fights are being held. One night, after watching a match involving local champion Hammerman, Bone makes a deal with promoter Pinball to get him into the fight scene for 20% of his earnings; 40% if Pinball puts his own money on the line. On that same night, Bone encounters mob boss James and his girlfriend Angela Soto. Bone enters his first underground fight and quickly defeats his opponent with only two kicks. Pinball explains to Bone that Angela was previously married, but James set up her husband Danny on a triple-homicide, sending him to jail. When James learned that she was pregnant, he had her undergo an abortion. Since then, Angela has fallen into drug addiction.

Over the next few nights, Bone makes a name for himself in the underground fighting scene, defeating every fighter in his path and earning himself and Pinball thousands in cash. At the same time, he bonds with the people who live at his apartment building: Tamara - the landlady who manages his apartment, Roberto - an elderly Latin-American man whom he plays chess with, and Jared - a young boy Tamara adopted after his father was sent to prison. Then, after making the once-undefeated Hammerman fall to the ground, Bone is offered a deal by James. The international underground fighting scene is run by a league of rich, powerful men known as the "Consortium", but mainly by a black market arms dealer named Franklin McVeigh, and James wants Bone to square off against Pretty Boy Price, the reigning champion. 
After telling James he will consider the offer, Bone reveals to Angela that he was cell mates and close friends with Danny. Then one day, Danny was murdered by an inmate named JC. Angela reveals that shortly after Danny went to prison, she gave birth to a son, but lost custody of him and does not know if he is still alive. Bone promises to bring her to her son, but sends her to a drug rehab clinic until she is ready.

The next morning, James offers McVeigh US$5 million to have him get the Consortium approve and schedule a fight between Bone and Price. That night, Bone discovers that Roberto has been murdered in front of the apartment, mauled to death by James' dogs because he witnessed one of James' street killings. Bone declines the offer to fight for James mainly because he never agreed to it; as a result, James orders his thugs to hunt down Bone and Pinball. James' bodyguard Teddy D and his thugs head to the rehab clinic to pick up Angela, only to have Bone and Pinball dispatch them. Transmitting his location through Teddy D's GPS phone, James has the duo follow him to McVeigh's mansion. There, Bone is ordered by James to fight Price and win back his money, or else he will have Angela, Tamara, Jared and Pinball killed. During the conversation, Bone secretly records James' revelation that he had Danny set up and murdered through the GPS phone, which he transmits to Pinball's cell phone; Pinball then sends the video to the police. Bone faces Price, but at the point where he is close to defeating him, he taps the ground and forfeits the fight. An infuriated James grabs his katana and attacks Bone, but Bone is thrown a jian by McVeigh's bodyguard to even the odds. Bone drops the sword and uses the sheath instead, beating James with it. In the middle of the melee, Bone redirects a sword slash, causing James to cut off his own hand. He runs off before the police arrive at the mansion to arrest James.

The next day, Angela is reunited with Jared. Tamara, who had threatened to kick Bone out due to his association with James, offers him to stay; he declines, saying he will only cause further trouble. Before exiting the apartment, he leaves her an envelope full of cash and asks her to take Angela in once she is rehabilitated. He also parts ways with Pinball, saying he has business to take care of.

During the end credits, McVeigh sends JC and his gang to punish James in the prison showers, where he is attacked and sodomized with a shiv.

Cast
Several well-known martial artists appear in this film, including Judokan legend Gene LeBell in the non-speaking part of a nurse. A contemporary of Bruce Lee, LeBell is the noted inspiration of the character of Cliff Booth in Quentin Tarantino's Once Upon a Time in Hollywood. Also cast in a non-speaking role is Robert Wall, who appeared in three of Lee's films. Not coincidentally, Wall portrays O'Hara, a member of the Consortium; in the Lee film, Enter the Dragon, he appeared as "O'Harra". Fumio Demura, a noted karate master, also appears in a non-speaking role as another member of the Consortium.

Michael Jai White as Isaiah Bone, an ex-convict and highly skilled martial artist who enters the underground fighting scene.
Eamonn Walker as James, a local mob leader and the film's main antagonist.
Dante Basco as "Pinball", a local fight promoter who befriends Bone.
Ahmed Abdulle as Roland, A Fighter from Boston.
Michelle Belegrin as Angela Soto, Danny's wife, and Jared's mother.
Julian Sands as Franklin McVeigh, a black market arms dealer of British descent who runs the international underground fighting scene.
Matt Mullins as "Pretty Boy" Price, McVeigh's Top Fighter.
Ron Yuan as Teddy "Teddy D", James' bodyguard.
Bob Sapp as Hammerman, James' Top Fighter.
Nona Gaye as Tamara, the landlady of the apartment in which Bone stays.
Brody Lee and Cody Lee as Jared, a young boy adopted by Tamara after his father was sent to prison.
Dick Anthony Williams as Roberto, an elderly man who lives in the same apartment building in which Bone lives. 
Shannon Kane as Chanel
Kimbo Slice as J.C., an inmate who is stabbed by Bone in an attempt to kill him at the beginning of the film.
Kevin Phillips as Danny Soto, Angela's husband, and Jared's father, who was cellmates with Bone before being murdered by J.C.
Gina Carano as Veretta "Vendetta"
Ernest "The Cat" Miller as "Mommie Dearest", an underground fighter billed as "The Homicidal Homosexual".
Maurice Smith as "Fast Hands", an underground fighter.
Tanoai Reed as "Gold Tooth"
Stuart F. Wilson as "Cowboy"
Mary Christina Brown as Anastasia, Franklin McVeigh's henchwoman.
Louie Torrellas as Kevin
Melvin Anthony as Jeffrey
Erik Betts as "Ratchet"
William Washington as "Weepy"
Jesse Smith, Jr. as "Razor"
Andre Edwards as Curtis

References

External links
 Official site
 
 
 Blood and Bone DVD Review

2009 films
2009 direct-to-video films
2009 action films
Films set in Los Angeles
Films shot in Los Angeles
Films scored by Nicholas Pike
American gangster films
Kung fu films
Karate films
American martial arts films
Mixed martial arts films
Underground fighting films
Martial arts tournament films
2000s English-language films
2000s American films